All TV is a Canadian exempt Category B Korean language specialty channel. It is owned by Jang Sung Lee and was launched in September 2001.

All TV features a mix of local programming as well as foreign programming from Korea.  The foreign programming that airs on All TV comes from MBC.  Local programming is produced in All TV's state of the art broadcast centre which includes three studios, 10 video editing suites and sound recording facilities, and is located in the Korean Cultural Centre in Toronto.  The programs that are produced include a daily newscast, talk shows, cooking shows and a real estate program.

On January 18, 2019, the CRTC approved All TV Inc's request to convert All TV from a licensed Category B specialty service to an exempted Cat. B third language service.

ALL TV K

In July 2009, All TV launched KBS World on Rogers Cable.  Seabridge Media operated a similar service until early 2009 when the company shut down.  At that point All TV stepped in and launched their KBS World channel allowing the service to remain on the air in Canada.  In 2013, the channel was renamed All TV K.

Content agreement with SBS
In December 2010, All TV announced that they had signed a content agreement with Korean broadcaster SBS.  Programming from SBS began airing on All TV on December 13, 2010.

As of 2018, All TV no longer airs any programming from SBS.

All TV HD
On July 18, 2013, All TV launched All TV HD, a high definition simulcast of the standard definition feed.  It is currently available on Bell Fibe TV.

See also 
 All TV K

References

External links
  
 MBC America

Digital cable television networks in Canada
Korean-Canadian culture
Multicultural and ethnic television in Canada
Korean-language television stations
Television channels and stations established in 2001